Boyd Dunlop Morehead (24 August 1843 – 30 October 1905) was a politician in Queensland, Australia. He was Premier of Queensland from November 1888 to June 1890.

Early life
Boyd Morehead was born in Sydney, New South Wales, the second son and child of two sons and two daughters (and the only son to reach full adulthood) of businessman Robert Archibald Alison Morehead and his wife Helen Buchanan, née Dunlop. He studied at Sydney Grammar School and later matriculated at University of Sydney in 1860. He, however, did not continue at the university but joined the Bank of New South Wales, where he obtained some training in finance. He then entered the service of the Australian Investments Company and as a station inspector visited Queensland in 1866.

In 1873 he founded the well-known 
firm of B. D. Morehead and Company, general merchants, and stock and station agents, which afterwards became Moreheads Limited.

Political career
On 4 September 1871 (in the 1871 Queensland colonial election), Morehead was elected a member of the Legislative Assembly of Queensland for the Mitchell electorate. He successfully held the seat in the 1873 and 1878 elections but resigned on 30 December 1880 in order to be appointed to the Queensland Legislative Council on 31 December 1880.

In December 1880 he joined the first Thomas McIlwraith government as Postmaster-General and as the Government's Representative in the Legislative Council, until he resigned from the Legislative Council on 3 August 1883.

On 5 October 1883, Morehead was re-elected to the Queensland Legislative Assembly in the seat of Balonne from October 1883 to April 1896. When Samuel Griffith came into power in November 1883, Morehead was appointed leader of the opposition and held this position for some years. McIlwraith became premier again in June 1888 with Morehead as colonial secretary.

When McIlwraith resigned, Morehead succeeded him on 30 November 1888 as Premier of Queensland and colonial secretary. Morehead was an opponent of Women's suffrage Morehead resigned 12 August 1890 and made a long visit to Europe.

The 1893 financial crisis caused heavy losses for Morehead's share investments. Also in 1893 he declined the agent-generalship.

On 10 June 1896 Morehead was re-appointed to the Queensland Legislative Council. He remained a member until his death on 30 October 1905.

Family

Morehead was married twice. His first wife was Annabella Campbell, née Ranken (died 1890), whom he married at Lockyersleigh, Goulburn, on 4 June 1873, and with whom he had seven daughters. His second wife was Ethel, née Seymour (died 1952), whom he married in Brisbane on 3 April 1895, and with whom he had one daughter.

His niece Margaret Goff (née Morehead) was the mother of Helen Lyndon Goff, who achieved fame as P. L. Travers, the author of Mary Poppins.

Later life
Morehead died from a cerebral haemorrhage on 30 October 1905 at a private hospital in Gregory Terrace, Brisbane. His funeral proceeded from Valmore, the Wooloowin home of his son-in-law, Orme Darvall, to the Toowong Cemetery.

He was honoured in 1993, when botanist F.M. Bailey published Bambusa moreheadiana, then in 2005, it became Mullerochloa moreheadiana.

References
'Morehead, Boyd Dunlop (1843–1905)', Australian Dictionary of Biography, Vol. 5, Melbourne University Press, 1974, pp 284–285. Retrieved 2009-10-15 and NSW Birth Death & Marriages retrieved 2009-12-10

External links

1843 births
1905 deaths
Premiers of Queensland
People educated at Sydney Grammar School
Members of the Queensland Legislative Council
Burials at Toowong Cemetery
Members of the Queensland Legislative Assembly
19th-century Australian politicians
Australian stock and station agents
19th-century Australian businesspeople